Casey Urlacher (born August 24, 1979) is an American politician and former football player. He has been the mayor of Mettawa, Illinois since 2013. Urlacher previously played football in the Arena Football League for two seasons for the Chicago Rush and Nashville Kats. He is the brother of former National Football League linebacker Brian Urlacher.

Early life
Casey Urlacher was born to Brad and Lavoyda Urlacher in 1979. Following the couple’s divorce, Lavoyda moved the family to Lovington, New Mexico where she later married Troy Lenard.

During his high school years, Urlacher distinguished himself as a premier football player, helping Lovington High School record a 14-0 season. Together, Casey and his older brother, Brian, earned a prodigious reputation around Lovington. Following Brian’s graduation, Casey was promoted to captain of the football team. Also, outside of football, Urlacher ran track and played basketball and baseball.

College career
Urlacher spent his first two years of college at the New Mexico Military Institute. During his first two years, he only managed to play for one season, while redshirting the other.

In 2000, Urlacher moved in with his brother Brian in his house in Lake Bluff, Illinois, and attended Lake Forest College playing with the team for three seasons.

Professional football career
Urlacher was not selected in the 2003 NFL Draft. The Chicago Bears granted him a professional try-out during their training camp in 2003, but Urlacher failed to make the final roster.

The Chicago Rush arena football team signed him to play as a fullback and linebacker, but Urlacher failed to make the team's roster after training camp and was released. Upon his release, Casey signed with the Peoria Pirates of af2, then the Nashville Kats before being cut in 2005 and joining the Chicago Rush again for a short time.

Civic and political career
In April 2013, Urlacher was elected Mayor of the Village of Mettawa, Illinois, having won 61% of the vote. In October of that year, Urlacher was appointed by Illinois Governor Pat Quinn (D) to the Illinois' Civil Service Commission. Bruce Rauner reappointed Urlacher to the Illinois Civil Service Commission on May 8, 2017. He served until February 2020, when he resigned his seat.

Urlacher announced his intention to seek the Republican nomination to run for State Senate in the 26th district to succeed Dan Duffy on October 1, 2015. His attempt to get on the ballot was challenged, and state election officials invalidated more than 1000 of his collected signatures leaving him with only 48 above the minimum. In March 2016, Urlacher was defeated in a three-way primary by Dan McConchie by over 1,300 votes.

After the federal indictment, Urlacher initially did not seek re-election as mayor of Mettawa in the 2021 consolidated election. However after obtaining the pardon from President Trump, Urlacher declared as a write-in candidate for Mayor. He was re-elected after obtaining 157 write-in votes. Urlacher told the Daily Herald (Arlington Heights, Illinois) that he filed as a write-in after being urged by his neighbors.

In May of 2021, Casey Urlacher filed to run for state senate. Dan McConchie, whom defeated Urlacher in 2016, currently serves as the Illinois senate minority leader. Although Urlacher filed to challenge McConchie in the primary, the new state legislative maps put Urlacher in a different district.

Federal indictment
Urlacher was among 10 people charged in a federal indictment alleging they ran an offshore sports gambling ring that raked in millions of dollars from hundreds of Chicago-area gamblers. The ring was led by Vincent "Uncle Mick" DelGuidice, a reputed associate of the Chicago Outfit who owned a gambling website registered in Costa Rica. Urlacher first was a customer of the gambling ring, before accumulating substantial debts, which he agreed to work off by recruiting new gamblers and collecting debts. He was charged with conspiracy and running an illegal gambling business. He is accused of acting as an agent for the gambling ring, recruiting bettors in exchange for a cut of their eventual losses. Urlacher pleaded not guilty to the charges in March of 2020. Urlacher was pardoned by President Donald Trump during his last hours in office on January 20, 2021.

References

External links
 Urlacher’s Official Website
 Urlacher’s College Stats and Information
 Urlacher’s Pro Stats

1979 births
Living people
People from Pasco, Washington
American football defensive tackles
American football offensive tackles
American football fullbacks
American football linebackers
Chicago Rush players
Nashville Kats players
Lake Forest Foresters football players
New Mexico Military Institute Broncos football players
Players of American football from New Mexico
People from Lovington, New Mexico
People from Lake Bluff, Illinois
Mayors of places in Illinois
People from Lake County, Illinois
Recipients of American presidential pardons